Whithed may refer to:

Henry Whithed, English soldier and politician
 Richard Whitehead (Hampshire MP) (1594– 1663), aka Richard Whithed, soldier in Parliamentary army in the English Civil War, MP between 1628 and 1653
 Richard Whithed (Stockbridge MP), English politician, MP for Stockbridge 1689–93